Brierley Hill Urban District was a former Urban District in Staffordshire, England, comprising the areas of Brierley Hill, Kingswinford, Quarry Bank, and Pensnett, now within the modern-day Dudley Metropolitan Borough in the West Midlands county.

Brierley Hill became an urban district in 1894 under the Local Government Act. Previously, it had been an urban sanitary authority within the parish of Kingswinford. It was greatly expanded in 1934, when it took in the Quarry Bank and Kingswinford districts. It remained an independent urban district until 1966, when it was merged into the Dudley County Borough under the advice of the Local Government Commission for England.

References

Urban districts of England
History of Dudley
Districts of England created by the Local Government Act 1894